Conway Holmes Hayman (January 9, 1949 – March 7, 2020) was an American football player and coach. He played as a guard in college and professionally and later became a collegiate head football coach.

Playing career

University of Delaware
Hayman was a lineman at the University of Delaware in Newark where he played from 1968 through the 1970 seasons.  Hayman's Blue Hens garnered three consecutive Lambert Cup titles, three straight Boardwalk Bowl wins, and two straight Middle Atlantic Conference championships. Hayman was a consensus first-team All-American and All-East selection at offensive guard in 1970 and was a two-time All-MAC selection. From his accomplishments at Delaware, Hayman was inducted into the state of Delaware Sports Hall of Fame.  Hayman was the second athlete from the school to play in the NFL.

Houston Oilers
Hayman was drafted in the sixth round with 141st overall pick in the 1971 NFL Draft by the Washington Redskins and subsequently traded to the Houston Oilers. He played for six seasons with the Oilers, appearing in a total of 77 regular season games.  He

Coaching career

Prairie View A&M
Hayman was the 15th head football at the Prairie View A&M University in Prairie View, Texas, serving for four seasons, from 1983 to 1986, and compiling a record of 5–36.

Assistant coaching
Hayman served as an assistant at Texas Southern University and Florida A&M University.

Honors
In 1986 the Delaware Sports Museum and Hall of Fame inducted Hayman.

Head coaching record

References

1949 births
2020 deaths
American football offensive linemen
Delaware Fightin' Blue Hens football players
Florida A&M Rattlers football coaches
Houston Oilers players
Prairie View A&M Panthers football coaches
Texas Southern Tigers football coaches
People from Newark, Delaware
Coaches of American football from Delaware
Players of American football from Delaware
African-American coaches of American football
African-American players of American football
20th-century African-American sportspeople
21st-century African-American sportspeople